Acriopsis indica is a species of orchid in the genus Acriopsis. It is widespread through much of Southeast Asia, native to Yunnan, Assam, Andaman Islands, Cambodia, Laos, Myanmar, Thailand, Vietnam, Borneo, Java, Lesser Sunda Islands, Malaysia, Philippines, Sulawesi.

References 

Cymbidiinae
Plants described in 1851
Orchids of the Philippines
Orchids of Yunnan
Flora of Indo-China
Orchids of Thailand
Orchids of Vietnam
Orchids of Malaysia
Orchids of Indonesia
Flora of Assam (region)